Kot Abdul Malik is a city in Sheikhupura District, Punjab, Pakistan located near the M-2 motorway. It is the 63rd largest city in Pakistan. Kot Abdul Malik is the part of Ferozewala Tehsil of Sheikhupura District.

The city is situated on the Lahore-Sheikhupura road.

References 

Populated places in Sheikhupura District